John Joseph Hughes is an Australian businessman best known for his eponymous car dealership.

Biography

Early life
Hughes was born in Fremantle, Western Australia in 1935 and attended Christian Brothers College, Fremantle. As a teenager he began working at a car dealership while studying accounting by correspondence. By his late 20s he owned his own car dealership.

Automotive sales
His dealership was the world's highest-selling Hyundai dealer for eight consecutive years between 1997–2003. John was pivotal in introducing the Korean car marque to Australia.  His automotive group also markets other major car brands, including, MG, LDV, Mitsubishi, Volkswagen, Ford, Kia and Chrysler's Jeep.

He is on record as driving only cars that he sells.

References

Further reading 
Dr Roger Smith, Barry Urquhart The Jindalee Factor: Insights on Western Australian Entrepreneurs, Marketing Focus, Australia (1988)
"Mr Who?" – The West Australian, 17 December 2005
Stephen Williams "Hughes Top Seller" – The West Australian, 27 March 2004

External links 
John Hughes's Big Walk
John Hughes's corporate website

Salespeople
People from Perth, Western Australia
Living people
1935 births